Florencite-(Sm) is a very rare mineral of the plumbogummite group (alunite supergroup) with simplified formula SmAl3(PO4)2(OH)6. Samarium in florencite-(Sm) is substituted by other rare earth elements, mostly neodymium. It does not form separate crystals, but is found as zones in florencite-(Ce), which is cerium-dominant member of the plumbogummite group. Florencite-(Sm) is also a samarium-analogue of florencite-(La) (lanthanum-dominant) and waylandite (bismuth-dominant), both being aluminium-rich minerals.

Occurrence and association
Florencite-(Sm) was revealed in quartz veins in the Maldynyrd Range, Subpolar Urals, Russia. It associates with xenotime-(Y).

Notes on chemistry
Florencite-(Sm) has admixtures of neodymium, and small amounts of cerium, gadolinium, sulfur, strontium, praseodymium, calcium, lanthanum, europium, and silicon.

References

Samarium minerals
Aluminium minerals
Phosphate minerals
Trigonal minerals
Minerals in space group 166
Crandallite group
Minerals described in 2010